Yes Man is a 2008 American romantic comedy film directed by Peyton Reed, written by Nicholas Stoller, Jarrad Paul, and Andrew Mogel and starring Jim Carrey and co-starring Zooey Deschanel. The film is based loosely on the 2005 memoir of the same name by humorist Danny Wallace, who also makes a cameo appearance in the film.

Production for the film began in Los Angeles in October 2007. It was released on December 19, 2008 in the United States and was then released in the United Kingdom on December 26, 2008. The film received mixed reviews from critics, but was a box office success, making $223 million worldwide.

Plot

Carl, a bank loan officer, has become withdrawn since his divorce from Stephanie. He has an increasingly negative outlook on his life and routinely ignores his friends Peter and Rooney. On the advice of an old colleague, Nick, Carl attends a motivational seminar that encourages people to seize the opportunity to say "Yes!" At the seminar, Carl meets inspirational guru Terrence, who tells him to enter a "covenant with the universe" and say yes to anything asked of him.

Later, Carl says yes to a homeless man's request and is stranded out-of-gas and with no battery on his cell phone in Elysian Park. Disillusioned, he hikes to a nearby gas station where he meets Allison, an unorthodox young woman. She gives him a ride back to his car on her scooter and kisses him before leaving. A few days later he is offered oral sex by his elderly neighbour Tillie in return for helping her put up shelves; when he refuses and immediately experiences bad luck he returns and surprisingly enjoys the moment. 

Believing that he must say "yes" or suffer the consequences, Carl starts to seize every opportunity that comes his way. He renews his friendships with Peter and Rooney; builds a bond with his nerdy boss, Norman; assists Peter's fiancée, Lucy, with her bridal shower; attends Korean language classes; and much more. Accepting a band flyer outside of a coffee shop, he sees an idiosyncratic band called Munchausen by Proxy; the lead singer is Allison. He is charmed by her quirkiness; she is delighted by his spontaneity and they begin dating. He earns a corporate promotion at work and, making use of his guitar lessons, plays Third Eye Blind's song "Jumper" to persuade a man not to commit suicide.

Carl and Allison meet at the airport for a spontaneous weekend excursion. Having decided to take the first plane out of town, regardless of its destination, they end up in Lincoln, Nebraska, where they bond more. Allison confesses her love for Carl and asks him to move in with her and he hesitantly agrees. While checking in for the return flight, Carl and Allison are detained by FBI agents who, due to various coincidences in Carl's recent behaviour, have profiled him as a potential terrorist. Peter travels to Nebraska as Carl's attorney and explains the situation, revealing the truth to Allison at the same time. She begins to doubt whether his commitment to her was ever sincere. Deciding that she can no longer trust him, she leaves Carl and refuses to return his phone calls. 

Carl's life takes a turn for the worse and he almost forgets about Lucy's shower. He manages to arrange a major surprise party, as well as set up Norman and Rooney with Soo-Mi and Tillie respectively. After the party Carl receives a tearful phone call from Stephanie, whose new boyfriend has walked out on her. When he goes to her apartment to comfort her, she kisses him and asks him to spend the night with her. After Carl emphatically says no, his luck takes a turn for the worse.

Deciding he must end the covenant, Carl returns to the convention centre and hides in the backseat of Terrence's convertible so he can be released. However, he reveals himself while Terrence is driving, startling him and causing an oncoming vehicle to collide with them. After Carl regains consciousness in the hospital, Terrence tells him the covenant was not real - it was merely a starting point to open Carl's mind to other possibilities, not to permanently take away his ability to say no if he needed to.

Freed from this restraint, Carl finds Allison teaching her sports-photography lesson and admits that he is not ready to move in with her just yet, but that he genuinely loves her, and they reconcile with a kiss as Allison's students take pictures.

Carl later convinces the attendees of Terrence's next seminar to donate the clothes off their backs to charity, and Terrence is greeted by an entirely nude convention centre.

Cast

Production
Yes Man is based on a memoir of the same name by humourist Danny Wallace. The book tells of the 6-month period in which he committed himself to saying 'Yes' to everything based on a brief conversation with a stranger he met on the bus. Wallace also has a cameo in the film, in the final bar-scene of the movie, in which he is speaking to someone behind Danny Masterson.

Jim Carrey declined an upfront salary for his role in the film. He was instead paid 36.2% of the film's gross after its production and marketing costs were recovered.

During shooting of a scene where Carrey's character bungee jumps off a bridge, Carrey interrupted and asked to do the stunt himself. Carrey stated to the stunt double that he intended to do it in one take. When he jumps off, he is seen taking out a cell phone for the scene.

While shooting the scene in the bar where Carrey's character turns around into a waitress and falls flat on his back, Carrey executed the stunt incorrectly and fell to the floor harder than he expected, breaking three ribs in the process.

Carrey learned basic Korean for a scene. Language coach John Song was hired to teach Carrey for ten weeks; Song also played the character's Korean teacher in a brief cameo. Similarly extensive training was needed for the scenes in which Carrey's character learns to play the guitar; Carrey tried to play during the years of his childhood, but "quit before ever learning a chord". Carrey said in an interview with HBO: "Just learning the basic chords was maybe the most challenging part of any movie I've worked on in my career. Peyton [Reed] even joked about the guitar part being dubbed, or just cut altogether." Reed played the song "Jumper" by Third Eye Blind, which had a high number of digital downloads after the film's theatrical release. After the final date of filming, Carrey "retired" his set guitar, and Deschanel kept it. When asked about this, Carrey said: "I'll never need that, or any guitar ever again; guitar is not for me! Never has been, never will be!" 

The film's soundtrack features original music by Munchausen by Proxy, a fictional band named after the Münchausen syndrome by proxy (a psychological disorder). In the film, the band consists of actress Deschanel on lead vocals and the San Francisco-based all-female band Von Iva, a trio of vocals, keyboards and drums. Von Iva's members collaborated with Deschanel, a singer-songwriter and one half of the duo She & Him, on writing and recording the band's songs for the film. Von Iva got the part of the fictional ensemble in the film after the movie's music supervisor, Jonathan Karp, saw the cover of their CD in Amoeba in Hollywood. For the DVD/Blu-ray release of the film, Deschanel and Von Iva filmed a spoof MTV music show-style documentary on the band for which they filmed mock music videos for several of the songs; the home video release also includes full-length performances by the group that were not included in the film.

The soundtrack also features nine songs by Eels, including a brand-new song entitled "Man Up".

The introduction music at the beginning of the film from Carrey's ringtone comes from the song "Separate Ways" by Journey. It is also featured when Carrey's character bails out from the hospital to catch the joggography at 6 am. "Helicopter" by Bloc Party plays on the first joggography scene.

Release

Critical reception
Yes Man received mixed reviews. Review aggregator Rotten Tomatoes gave the film a rating of 46%, based on 153 reviews, with an average rating of 5.3. The site's consensus reads, "Jim Carrey's comic convulsions are the only bright spots in this otherwise dim and predictable comedy." On Metacritic, the film has a score of 46 out of 100, based on 30 critics, indicating "mixed or average reviews". Audiences polled by CinemaScore gave the film an average grade of "A" on an A+ to F scale.

Many critics thought that its plot was too similar to Carrey's 1997 film Liar Liar.

In his review for The Miami Herald, Rene Rodriguez wrote, "Yes Man is fine as far as Jim Carrey comedies go, but it's even better as a love story that just happens to make you laugh." Kyle Smith of The New York Post wrote: "The first time I saw Yes Man, I thought the concept was getting kind of stale toward the end. As it turns out, that was only the trailer." Roger Ebert of the Chicago Sun Times gave the film 2 out of 4, and compared it to Liar Liar. He said "Jim Carrey works the premise for all it's worth, but it doesn't allow him to bust loose and fly.".

Box office
The film opened No. 1 in its first weekend at the US box office with $18.3 million, and was top of the UK box office in its first weekend after release.

To date, the film has taken in more than $220 million worldwide, surpassing Jim Carrey's previous comedy Fun with Dick and Jane but falling short of his 2003 film Bruce Almighty.

Accolades

2009 BMI Film Music Award
 Best Music – Lyle Workman (Won)
2009 Taurus World Stunt Awards
 Best Overall Stunt by a Woman – Monica Braunger (Nominated)
2009 Artios Awards
 Best Casting – David Rubin & Richard Hicks (Nominated)
2009 MTV Movie Awards
 Best Comedic Performance – Jim Carrey (Won)
2009 Teen Choice Awards
 Choice Movie Actor – Comedy – Jim Carrey (Nominated)
 Choice Movie Rockstar Moment – Jim Carrey (Nominated)
 Choice Movie Hissy Fit – Jim Carrey (Nominated)
 Choice Movie: Comedy (Nominated)
2009 Kid's Choice Awards
 Favorite Movie Actor – Jim Carrey (Nominated)

Home media

The film was released on DVD and Blu-ray on April 7, 2009.

References

Further reading

External links

 
 
 Yes Man Production Details

2008 films
2008 romantic comedy films
American business films
American romantic comedy films
British romantic comedy films
2000s English-language films
Films directed by Peyton Reed
Films based on memoirs
Films about banking
Films set in Los Angeles
Films shot in Nebraska
Heyday Films films
2000s Korean-language films
Village Roadshow Pictures films
Warner Bros. films
Films produced by Richard D. Zanuck
Films produced by David Heyman
Films with screenplays by Nicholas Stoller
Films scored by Lyle Workman
2000s business films
The Zanuck Company films
2000s American films
2000s British films
English-language romantic comedy films